Phebalium canaliculatum is a species of erect shrub that is endemic to the southwest of Western Australia. It is more or less covered with silvery and rust-coloured scales and has thin, cylindrical leaves and dark pink to pale mauve flowers in umbels on the ends of branches.

Description
The filaments of the stamens are pale mauve with a yellow anther. Flowering occurs in May or from July to October.

Taxonomy and naming
This species was first formally described in 1896 by Ferdinand von Mueller and Ralph Tate from specimens collected by James Drummond "towards Ularing" during Giles's third expedition. It was given the name Eriostemon canaliculatus and the description was published in the Transactions of the Royal Society of South Australia. In 1958, James Hamlyn Willis changed the name to Phebalium canaliculatum, publishing the name change in The Victorian Naturalist.

Distribution and habitat
Phebalium canaliculatum grows on sandplains and hillslopes, sometimes on rock outcrops, in shrubland or mallee between Wongan Hills, Sandstone and Kalgoorlie.

Conservation status
Phebalium canaliculatum is classified as "not threatened" by the Western Australian Government Department of Parks and Wildlife.

References

canaliculatum
Flora of Western Australia
Plants described in 1896
Taxa named by Ferdinand von Mueller
Taxa named by Ralph Tate